Paradise is a lost 1926 American silent escapist-romance film directed by Irvin Willat and released by First National Pictures. The film stars Milton Sills, Betty Bronson and Noah Beery. Based on the popular 1925 novel Paradise by Cosmo Hamilton and John Russell, it was one of Sills' most successful films.

Story
A stunt pilot, Tony, marries Chrissie and the two are given a tropical island wedding, which is a lot of fun at first. They are considered the King and Queen of their island by the natives. The fun turns into island turmoil at the machinations of island despot Quex.

Cast
Milton Sills as Tony
Betty Bronson as Chrissie
Noah Beery as Quex
Lloyd Whitlock as Teddy
Kate Price as Lady George
Charlie Murray as Lord Lumley
Claude King as Pollock
Charles Brook as Perkins
Edward Cooper as McCoustie

Preservation status
Paradise lost.

References

External links

Southseascinema.org
Lobby Poster, icollector.com
Still of Milton Sills and Betty Bronson, stanford.edu

1926 films
American silent feature films
Lost American films
Films directed by Irvin Willat
First National Pictures films
1920s romance films
American black-and-white films
American romance films
Films based on British novels
1920s American films